Hugo Raúl Carballo (April 23, 1944 in Resistencia, Argentina – September 30, 1998 in Resistencia, Argentina) was a former Argentine naturalized Chilean footballer who played for clubs of Argentina and Chile.

Teams
   1961–1964 
  Nueva Chicago 1964
   1964 
  Gimnasia y Esgrima de La Plata 1966–1968
  River Plate 1969–1971
  Atlanta 1972–1974
  Universidad de Chile 1975–1982
  Santiago Wanderers 1983
  O'Higgins 1984
  Huachipato 1985

Honors
River Plate
Argentine Primera División: Runner Up - 1969

Universidad de Chile
Copa Polla Gol: Champions - 1979

External links
 Profile at BDFA 
 Hugo Carballo at MemoriaWanderers 

1944 births
1998 deaths
People from Resistencia, Chaco
Sportspeople from Chaco Province
Argentine footballers
Argentine expatriate footballers
Argentine expatriate sportspeople in Chile
Expatriate footballers in Chile
Argentine emigrants to Chile
Naturalized citizens of Chile
Chilean footballers
Nueva Chicago footballers
Club de Gimnasia y Esgrima La Plata footballers
Club Atlético River Plate footballers
Club Atlético Atlanta footballers
Universidad de Chile footballers
Santiago Wanderers footballers
O'Higgins F.C. footballers
C.D. Huachipato footballers
Chilean Primera División players
Argentine Primera División players
Association footballers not categorized by position